Yanaul (Yañawıl) is a rural locality (a selo) in Isimovsky Selsoviet, Kugarchinsky District, Bashkortostan, Russia. The population was 241 as of 2010. There is 1 street.

Geography 
Yanaul is located 28 km southwest of Mrakovo (the district's administrative centre) by road. Saratovsky is the nearest rural locality.

References 

Rural localities in Kugarchinsky District